KZLB (92.1 FM, "92 Rock") is a radio station that broadcasts out of Fort Dodge, Iowa airing an active rock format. The station is owned by Alpha Media, through licensee Alpha 3E Licensee LLC.

On October 3, 2019, KZLB changed their format from classic rock to active rock, branded as "92 Rock".

References

External links
92 Rock official website
Three Eagles Communications

ZLB
Fort Dodge, Iowa
Radio stations established in 1990
Alpha Media radio stations
Active rock radio stations in the United States